Djamel El Okbi (15 October 1939 – 15 December 1994) was a professional Algerian footballer who played as a goalkeeper for USM Alger.

Life and career

Honours
 Championnat National
 Winner: 1962-63

Clubs
 AS Saint-Eugènoise (1957–1960)
 USM Alger (1962–1969)

References

1939 births
1994 deaths
Algerian footballers
Ligue 1 players
Footballers from Algiers
USM Alger players
People from Kouba
Association football goalkeepers